24/7 is a 2020 Philippine action drama television series starring Julia Montes. The series premiered on  ABS-CBN's Yes Weekend! Sunday block and worldwide via The Filipino Channel from February 23 to March 15, 2020, replacing The Haunted.

Plot
About a mother who can do everything for her beloved son. Mia (Julia Montes) is a security officer in Jacinto Pharmaceuticals and a single mother raising her son Xavier. One epidemic, a hybrid of dengue and malaria are spreading, where casualties are high and vaccines to cure it are not given by the company, for a certain reason. She tries desperately to beg her boss a dose, but declined. She stole a case full, but costed her life when Franco killed her in a market. The medicine works, but she died nonetheless. her son was cured, and became a poster boy for his mother's deed, and became a scientist and an inventor in 2045, creating a holographic stick.

The time would rewound back to 2020 where Mia saw news clips about her death in the mysterious stick. She decides to change the fate, by doing the same thing, but this time, she was more careful. She now tries to find clues about the epidemic, and tries to save as many victims as she could.

Cast and characters
Main cast
 Julia Montes as Mia Agbayani 
 Edu Manzano as Claudio S. Jacinto
 Arjo Atayde as Dr. Cedric Jacinto
 JC Santos as Dr. Angelo "Jelo" Pecson
 Pen Medina as Dado Narvaez
 Denise Laurel as Dr. Delilah Gomez
 Joem Bascon as Detective Hector Perez
 Joross Gamboa as Emerson G. Agbayani
 Melissa Ricks as Belinda/Bella Samonte-Perez

Supporting cast
 Prinz Skie Bautista as Xavier Agbayani
 Eric Fructuoso as Gregorio "Gregor" Baltazar
 Meryll Soriano as Cristina Capili
 Anna Luna as Charlotte Narvaez
 Pepe Herrera as Mario Miranda
 Benj Manalo as Santino "Otep" Viray 
 Patrick Sugui as Kyle Pecson
 Paeng Sudayan as Luigi Narvaez
 Alora Sasam as Cynthia Viray

Special Participation
 Amy Austria as Lourdes Jacinto
 McCoy de Leon as Gerard Capili†
 Matt Evans as Sebastian "Bogs" Galvez†
 Tony Labrusca as Xavier Agbayani (future)
 Jameson Blake as young Claudio
 Luke Alford as young Cedric

Broadcast
The series aired on ABS-CBN's Yes Weekend! Sunday block and worldwide via The Filipino Channel.

From March 15, 2020, production of new episodes were temporarily suspended by the enhanced community quarantine in Luzon put in place because of the COVID-19 pandemic in the Philippines, the show was put on hiatus and temporarily replaced by reruns of Wansapanataym in its timeslot until the closure of ABS-CBN's free-to-air network (Channel 2) on May 5, 2020 due to the cease and desist order issued by the National Telecommunications Commission on account of its franchise expiration.

The show was later cancelled due to the aforementioned circumstances.

Reception

See also
 List of programs broadcast by Kapamilya Channel
 List of programs broadcast by ABS-CBN
 List of ABS-CBN drama series

References

External links
 
 

ABS-CBN drama series
2020 Philippine television series debuts
2020s Philippine television series
Philippine action television series
Philippine thriller television series
Television series by Dreamscape Entertainment Television
Television shows set in the Philippines
Filipino-language television shows
Infectious diseases in fiction
Television series about viral outbreaks
Television productions suspended due to the COVID-19 pandemic